Henry Township is the name of two townships in the U.S. state of Indiana:

 Henry Township, Fulton County, Indiana
 Henry Township, Henry County, Indiana

Indiana township disambiguation pages